Cold Brook flows into West Canada Creek in Poland, New York, in Herkimer County. Cold Brook flows through the Village of Cold Brook.

References

Rivers of New York (state)
Rivers of Herkimer County, New York